Roger Chandler is the head coach of the Michigan State Spartans wrestling team.

Wrestling career

High school career
Chandler was an OHSAA state champion in 1992 for St. Edward High School while wrestling for Greg Urbas.  He was also runner-up at senior nationals.

College career
Chandler was a Big Ten Conference champion for the Indiana Hoosiers.  He was also an NCAA runner-up.

Coaching career
Chandler is currently the head coach at Michigan State.  Prior to becoming head coach, he was an assistant at Michigan State for 20 years.

References

Living people
American wrestlers
Indiana Hoosiers wrestlers
Year of birth missing (living people)